Qixia Mountain is a mountain in the northeast part of Nanjing, Jiangsu Province, China.

In the Southern Dynasties (420–589), there was a Qixia cottage in the mountain, so the mountain's name Qixia derived from it. Qixia Mountain has many scenic spots and historical sites. Its red autumnal leaves and especially its Dongfeitian grottos which were founded in 2000, make it a famous tourist attraction both at home and to abroad.

References

Geography of Nanjing
Mountains of Jiangsu